Goran Cvetković (born 9 December 1982) is a Serbian former football midfielder.

He previously played with many Serbian clubs, ACF Gloria Bistrița in Romanian top-level league and FC Sunkar in Kazakhstan Premier League.

References

External links
 
 
 List of foreign Liga I players

1982 births
Living people
Sportspeople from Prizren
Association football midfielders
Serbian footballers
FK Javor Ivanjica players
FK Zemun players
FK Inđija players
FK Kolubara players
Serbian expatriate footballers
Expatriate footballers in Romania
ACF Gloria Bistrița players
Expatriate footballers in Kazakhstan